Springfield Township is one of the eighteen townships of Richland County, Ohio, United States.  It is a part of the Mansfield Metropolitan Statistical Area.  The 2020 census found 11,064 people in the township, 4,408 of whom lived in the unincorporated portions of the township.

Geography
Located in the western part of the county, it borders the following townships and Cities:
 Ontario City- Center of the Township
 Mansfield City-Northeast
Jackson Township - north
Franklin Township - northeast corner
Madison Township - east
Washington Township - southeast corner
Troy Township - south
Sandusky Township - west
Sharon Township - northwest

Two cities are located in Springfield Township: part of Mansfield — the county seat of Richland County — in the northeast, and Ontario in the center.

According to the United States Census Bureau, the township has a total area of 36.6 square miles (58.9 km).All of the township is land and none of it is covered with water.

Name and history
It is one of eleven Springfield Townships statewide.

Government
The township is governed by a three-member board of trustees, who are elected in November of odd-numbered years to a four-year term beginning on the following January 1. Two are elected in the year after the presidential election and one is elected in the year before it. There is also an elected township fiscal officer, who serves a four-year term beginning on April 1 of the year after the election, which is held in November of the year before the presidential election. Vacancies in the fiscal officership or on the board of trustees are filled by the remaining trustees.

Safety and Services
A full service maintenance and service department repair and service township roads and provide support services for some cemeteries located in the township. The Richland County Sheriff's office helps to provide an enhanced law enforcement presence in the township. Ontario City Police department provides law enforcement to the areas incorporated into the City of Ontario located in the Township. Fire/EMS services are provided by Springfield Township Fire/EMS from two stations. The Department is led by Chief Matthew Carey and Assistant Chief Adam Spellman. The department operates a rotating 24 hour 3 platoon schedule.

Education
Most of Springfield Township shares the same school district with Ontario. Students attend Ontario Local School District, and the high school is Ontario High School. The district is made up of the previous Springfield Township School district.

References

External links
Township website
County website
More extensive township information
FD website

Townships in Richland County, Ohio
Townships in Ohio